The Groenhorst College is an education centre that has 11 locations in the centre of Netherlands: Almere, Barneveld, Bilthoven, Dronten, Ede (2 locations, including the management), Emmeloord (2 locations), Lelystad, Maartensdijk, Nijkerk and Velp. It offers several 'green' high school programmes, apprenticeship programmes on nutrition and nature & environment, education for adults, and several courses.

External links
 Groenhorst College

Schools in the Netherlands
Secondary schools in the Netherlands